In March 2016, an anonymous open letter, entitled The Open Letter about Calling for Comrade Xi Jinping's Resigning from His Leading Posts of the Party and the State, purporting to be from unnamed "loyal Communist Party members", allegedly resulted in the detention of dozens of Chinese citizens, including (temporarily) six relatives of two overseas dissidents.

Background
Chinese media is heavily regulated; government censors often remove content on websites and social media. By 2015, China had 49 reporters in prison, according to the Committee to Protect Journalists; Freedom House had ranked the country as the world's worst abuser of internet freedom. In February 2016, Xi Jinping visited state media outlets in a tour widely seen as an attempt to further rein in journalists and to eradicate freedom of expression. Early 2016 saw a spate of publicized censorship incidents and a crackdown on journalists, lawyers, and dissidents.

In recent years, China has detained relatives of dissident writers living overseas to pressure the writers into self-censorship.

Publication
The open letter asking Xi to resign his post of General Secretary of the Chinese Communist Party (paramount leader and party leader), was first posted on Canyu. It was republished by other outlets, most notably by the state-linked Watching.cn (also known as Wujie News), but was quickly taken down from Watching. The letter accuses Mr Xi of being a dictator and of committing serious economic and diplomatic blunders. The authors claim to be writing the letter out of concern for Xi and his family's "personal safety", which may be an implicit threat. The Wall Street Journal speculates that the open letter may indeed have been penned by dissatisfied insiders within the ruling Communist Party, as unlike typical dissident manifestos, the letter uses Party jargon and contains no call for significant democratic reform. Professor Xiao Qiang of the University of California, Berkeley, agreed the phrasing is unusual: "Bluff or true, this tone sounds more like coup plotters talking to the leader they want to depose, rather than an open letter with dissenting political views." On the other hand, the letter may be an elaborate ruse; there is no independent evidence of any coup plot.

Full text of the open letter in English

Government response
Prominent Chinese columnist Jia Jia was detained for ten days. Chang Ping, a liberal Chinese writer living in Germany, stated that two younger brothers and a younger sister were "abducted by the Chinese police" after Chang criticized Jia's detention. The government also detained the parents and younger brother of another liberal Chinese writer, Wen Yunchao, who lives in the United States. All three writers deny any involvement in the open letter. On March 30, 2016, Deutsche Welle reported that all the detained relatives of both dissidents had been released.

Ouyang Hongliang, the president of Watching, was also detained. According to the BBC, a Watching staff member stated at least 15 other people employed at Watching or an associated technology company had been "taken away". The report that ten of the detained employees worked for the technology company spurred speculation that perhaps the letter was published on Watching by a hacker, or alternatively by some sort of web-crawling software that republishes content.

See also 
 Human rights in China

References

External links 
 Full open letter in Watching (Chinese language)
 English translation of open letter

Human rights in China
Open letters
Xi Jinping
2016 documents
March 2016 events in China
2016 in China